Belize Bank (BB) is the first, oldest continuing, and largest bank in Belize.  , it had over BZ$880 million in assets and BZ$147 million of capital reserves. Its network of 11 branches covers the entire country. The Belize Bank Limited has a 44% market share in loans and 38% market share in deposits.  It maintains an international banking subsidiary in the Turks and Caicos Islands.

Apart from the normal personal and corporate banking service, Belize Bank offers high school scholarships and sixth form scholarships to students in need. Over 100 students have benefited from these scholarship programs each year.

History
American investors from Mobile, Alabama, incorporated the Bank of British Honduras in 1902, and it commenced operations in 1903.  In 1912 Royal Bank of Canada (RBC) bought the bank and proceeded to operate it as a branch.

In 1987, RBC sold the bank to an investment group headed by Lord Ashcroft as Belize Holdings, Inc., then Carlisle Holdings, then Belize Bank Holdings; the new owners renamed the bank, "Belize Bank".

In 2000, Belize Bank established Belize Bank (Turks and Caicos) - "Belize Bank (TCI)." As a result of expanding Caribbean business, in February 2009, Belize Bank Ltd, changed its name to British Caribbean Bank Ltd.

In 2015, the bank lost over three quarters of its deposits after it was caught up in a US tax-evasion crackdown.

The Board
Cheryl Jones, Non-executive Director (American)
Dr Euric Bobb, Non-executive Deputy Chairman, (Trinidadian)
Dr Ydahlia Metzgen, Non-executive director (Belizean/US)
Lyndon Guiseppi, Executive Chairman (Trinidadian)
Filippo Alario, Deputy Chief Executive Officer and Chief Risk Officer (US/Italian)
Geraldine Davis-Young, Non-executive Director (Belizean/US)
Michael Coye, Executive Director (Belizean)

References

External links

Official website

Banks established in 1902
Banks of Belize
Banks of Trinidad and Tobago
1902 establishments in British Honduras